IIAC may stand for:

Social sciences
 Institut Interdisciplinaire d'Anthropologie du Contemporain, a French research institute

Sports
 Interstate Intercollegiate Athletic Conference, a now-defunct college athletics conference, previously known as the Illinois Intercollegiate Athletic Conference
 Iowa Intercollegiate Athletic Conference, the former name of a college athletics conference now known as the American Rivers Conference

Airports
 Incheon International Airport Corporation,  a corporation which operates Incheon International Airport (Airport of Republic of Korea)